CCTV-17 is a Chinese free-to-air television channel, owned by China Central Television. It handles the agricultural programmes moved from CCTV-7 after the revamp of the latter channel.  This is a state-run TV channel.  As such, it has been criticized for its connection to the Chinese Communist Party.   

Trial broadcasts of the channel commenced on 1 August 2019, with a launch date of 23 September, as part of celebrations for the Chinese Farmers' Harvest Festival.

Programmes 

Jujiao Sannong (lit "Agricultural Watch")
Zhi Fu Jing (lit "Agribusiness Today")
Keji Lian (lit "Agritech Connect")
The Big Stage of Village
Xiang Yue (lit "Dating in the Countryside")
Repeats of TV series under Rural Theatre strand
Heroes Everywhere (遍地英雄)

References 

China Central Television channels
Television channels and stations established in 2019
2019 establishments in China
Agricultural television stations